Paalam is a 1983 Indian Malayalam-language film, directed by M. Krishnan Nair. The film stars Madhu, Srividya  and Ratheesh. The film has musical score by A. T. Ummer.

Cast
Madhu
Srividya
Ratheesh
Balan K. Nair
Swapna
Ravindran

Soundtrack
The music was composed by A. T. Ummer with lyrics by Poovachal Khader.

References

External links
 

1983 films
1980s Malayalam-language films
Films directed by M. Krishnan Nair